The 1855 Louisiana gubernatorial election was the second election to take place under the Louisiana Constitution of 1852. As a result of this election Robert C. Wickliffe became Governor of Louisiana.

Results
Popular Vote

References

1855
Louisiana
Gubernatorial
November 1855 events